"Our House Is Dadless" is the third single by British ska/indie band Kid British. It was released on 4 July 2009 on digital download and entered the UK Singles Chart at #63.

The song samples "Our House" by British ska band Madness.

Track listing
"Our House Is Dadless"
"Our House Is Dadless" (Bimbo Jones Remix)

References

2009 singles
Songs written by Chas Smash
Songs written by Chris Foreman
2009 songs
Kid British songs
Mercury Records singles
Madness (band)